Emmanuel Armah Kofi Buah (born 1966) is a Ghanaian politician who has served in the government of Ghana as Minister of Energy and Petroleum since 2013. Buah, a member of the National Democratic Congress, is the Member of Parliament of Ellembelle constituency in the Western Region. He is currently the Deputy Minority Leader in the Parliament of Ghana after replacing James Klutse Avedzi.

Education 
Emmanuel Armah Kofi Buah holds a law degree from the Kwame Nkrumah University of Science and Technology and a Master of Science degree in Management from the University of Maryland, University College in the United States.

Politics 
Kofi Buah was nominated by President Atta Mills in 2009 to serve as deputy Minister of Energy. On 17 January 2013, Buah was named as Minister for Energy and Petroleum. He was succeeded by Hon. Boakye Agyarko in 2017 when the New Patriotic Party won the 2016 Presidential elections. He has been the member of parliament for the Ellembelle Constituency since 2009. He serves on the Trade, Industry and Tourism committee, Members Holding Offices of Profit committee,  Privileges committee and Committee off Selection committee.

Personal life 
Buah has two children.

See also 
 List of Mahama government ministers

References

External links and sources 
 Profile on Ghana government website

Living people
1966 births
Energy ministers of Ghana
National Democratic Congress (Ghana) politicians
Kwame Nkrumah University of Science and Technology alumni
University of Maryland Global Campus alumni
Ghanaian MPs 2021–2025
Ghanaian MPs 2009–2013
Ghanaian MPs 2013–2017
Ghanaian MPs 2017–2021